Sir Harry Guy Dain FRCS (5 November 1870 – 26 February 1966) was a British physician.

Between 1887 and 1894 Dain studied science and medicine at Mason College (a predecessor college of the University of Birmingham). He graduated with a University of London external MB degree in medicine in 1894.

Dain was Chairman of the British Medical Association from 1943 to 1949 at the time of the creation of the National Health Service. He strongly opposed the creation of the National Health Service and led British Medical Association opposition to it, publicly clashing with Aneurin Bevan, the then Minister of Health.

Dain was knighted in 1961. Dain was elected a Fellow of the Royal College of Surgeons in 1945. He received an honorary LLD degree from Aberdeen University in 1939 and an honorary MD degree from Birmingham University in 1944.

References

1870 births
1966 deaths
Alumni of University of London Worldwide
Alumni of the University of London
Alumni of the University of Birmingham
20th-century British medical doctors
Fellows of the Royal College of Surgeons
Chairs of the Council of the British Medical Association
Knights Bachelor
People educated at King Edward VI Five Ways
Place of death missing